Vermejo River is a tributary of the Canadian River in Colfax County, New Mexico.  The river flows southeast from the confluence of North Fork Vermejo River and Little Vermejo Creek to a confluence with the Canadian River south of Maxwell.  The upper course of the Vermejo flows through Vermejo Park Ranch, one of the largest ranches in the U.S. and now devoted primarily to recreation such as fishing and hunting.

Vermejo (usually spelled bermejo) means "reddish" in Spanish and has the same origin as the word "vermilion."

See also
 List of rivers of New Mexico

References

Rivers of New Mexico
Rivers of Colfax County, New Mexico
Tributaries of the Arkansas River